Yves Pajot (born 20 April 1952) is a French sailor. He won a silver medal in the Flying Dutchman class with his brother Marc at the 1972 Summer Olympics. In 1987 he competed at the Louis Vuitton Cup. With his brother Marc, he also won the World Championships in the International 505 dinghy in 1974 Marstrand.

He skippered the Marseilles Syndicate in the 1987 Louis Vuitton Cup.

External links
 

1952 births
Living people
French male sailors (sport)
Olympic sailors of France
Sailors at the 1972 Summer Olympics – Flying Dutchman
Sailors at the 1976 Summer Olympics – Flying Dutchman
Olympic silver medalists for France
Olympic medalists in sailing
Medalists at the 1972 Summer Olympics
1987 America's Cup sailors
Flying Dutchman class world champions
World champions in sailing for France
Mediterranean Games gold medalists for France